Hassan Al-Habib (born 14 September 1994) is a Saudi professional footballer who plays as a midfielder for Al-Adalah on loan from Al-Fateh.

Career statistics

Club

External links

References

1994 births
Living people
Saudi Arabian footballers
People from Al-Hasa
Al-Adalah FC players
Ettifaq FC players
Al-Hazem F.C. players
Al-Fateh SC players
Saudi First Division League players
Saudi Professional League players
Association football midfielders
Saudi Arabian Shia Muslims